Vārme Manor is a manor house in Vārme Parish, Kuldīga Municipality, in the historical region of Courland, in western Latvia.

History 

Since 1926 it houses the Vārme primary school. In May 2016, the school celebrated its 90th anniversary.

Manor park 
Rare tree species grow in the formerly manor and now school park - Weymouth pine, Mountain pine, European larch, Dotted hawthorn, European beech, American ash, White walnut, White aspen, Balsam poplar, Silver poplar.

See also
List of palaces and manor houses in Latvia

References

External links

  Vārme Manor

Manor houses in Latvia
Kuldīga Municipality
Courland